Events in the year 1936 in Mexico.

Incumbents

Federal government
 President: Lázaro Cárdenas
 Interior Secretary (SEGOB): Silvestre Guerrero
 Secretary of Foreign Affairs (SRE): Eduardo Hay
 Communications Secretary (SCT): Francisco J. Múgica 
 Education Secretary (SEP): Gonzalo Vázquez Vela
 Secretary of Defense (SEDENA): Manuel Ávila Camacho

Supreme Court

 President of the Supreme Court: Daniel V. Valencia

Governors
 Aguascalientes: Enrique Osorio Camarena/Juan G. Alvarado Lavallade
 Campeche: Eduardo Mena Córdova
 Chiapas: Victórico R. Grajales/Efraín A. Gutiérrez
 Chihuahua: Rodrigo M. Quevedo
 Coahuila: Jesús Valdez Sánchez
 Colima: Miguel G. Santa Ana
 Durango: Enrique R. Calderón 
 Guanajuato: José Inocente Lugo
 Guerrero: José Inocente Lugo
 Hidalgo: Ernesto Viveros
 Jalisco: Everardo Topete
 State of Mexico: Eucario López
 Michoacán: Rafael Ordorica/Gildardo Magaña
 Morelos: José Refugio Bustamante
 Nayarit: Joaquín Cardoso
 Nuevo León: Gregorio Morales Sánchez/Anacleto Guerrero Guajardo
 Oaxaca: Anastasio García Toledo/Constantino Chapital
 Puebla: Gustavo Ariza
 Querétaro: Ramón Rodríguez Familiar
 San Luis Potosí: Mateo Fernández Netro
 Sinaloa: Manuel Páez
 Sonora: Ramón Ramos
 Tabasco: Víctor Fernández Manero
 Tamaulipas: Enrique Canseco
 Tlaxcala: Adolfo Bonilla	
 Veracruz: Miguel Alemán Valdés
 Yucatán: Fernando Cárdenas/Florencio Palomo Valencia
 Zacatecas: Matías Ramos

Events

Popular culture

Sports 
Mexico wins a total of three bronze medals at the Summer Olympics.

Music

Film
Allá en el Rancho Grande, directed by Fernando de Fuentes and starring Tito Guízar and Esther Fernández; beginning of the Golden Age of Mexican cinema

Literature

Births
6 January – Rubén Amaro Sr., Mexican professional baseball player (d. 2017)
23 February — Manuel Bartlett, politician (PRI)
8 March – Mario Hernández, film director and screenwriter
15 April – José Becerra, boxer
23 April — Víctor Cervera Pacheco, politician (PRI); Governor of Yucatán 1984–1988 and 1995–2001 (d. 2004)
8 May – Víctor Yturbe, singer (died 1987)
19 September – Juliana González Valenzuela, Mexican philosopher
8 October – Rogelio Guerra, actor (d. 2018)
27 October – Enrique Canales,  technologist, editor, political analyst, painter, and sculptor (died 2007)
Date unknown
Mario Stern, composer and académic (d. 2017).

Deaths
19 May – Pascual Díaz y Barreto, Archbishop of Mexico City (born 1876; colitis)

References

 
1930s in Mexico
Years of the 20th century in Mexico
Mexico